Melody of the Sea (Swedish: Havets melodi) is a 1934 Swedish drama film directed by John W. Brunius and starring Carl Ström, Greta Almroth and Sigge Fürst. Prince Vilhelm of Sweden co-directed the film. It was shot at the Sundbyberg Studios of Europa Film in Stockholm and on location around Gothenburg and Grisslehamn.

Cast
 Carl Ström as 	Lars Persson
 Greta Almroth as 	Mrs. Anna Persson
 Britta Jacobsson as 	Karin Persson
 Harry Bergvall as 	Anders Bergström
 Martha Colliander as 	Malin
 Sigge Fürst as 	Arne Andersson
 Palle Brunius as 	Bengt Hamberg
 Sven Andersson as 	Chef at Vinga Fireship
 Anna-Lisa Baude as Fagerlund's wife
 Folke Brandt as 	Fireman on Vinga Fireship
 Anna-Lisa Fröberg as 	Supervisor
 John Hilke as 	Captain
 Rudolf Karlsson as 	Fireman at Vinga lighthouse
 Nils Lundell as 	Fagerlund the machinist
 Nils Sandgren as Fireman on Vinga Fireship
 Nils Ström as 	director of Vinga Fireship
 Anton Wik as 	Fireman on Vinga Fireship

References

Bibliography 
 Sadoul, Georges. Dictionary of Film Makers. University of California Press, 1972.

External links 
 

1934 films
1934 drama films
Swedish drama films
1930s Swedish-language films
Swedish black-and-white films
Films directed by John W. Brunius
1930s Swedish films